Adria Dawn (born May 24, 1974 in Champaign, Illinois) is an American actress, filmmaker and educator. She is most known for her work on Ryan Murphy's cult hit Popular (1999–2001). She was nominated by Jane Magazine as "one of the gustiest women on television" for her portrayal of April Tuna. She continued working with Murphy in Nip/Tuck (2006) as Parker the Scientologist expert appearing in three episodes. Dawn's other notable television appearances include recurring roles in 7th Heaven (1999), Felicity (2002) and NCIS  (2006–2008) as well as a supporting role in the made-for-TV movie Running Mates (2000) and appearances on Judging Amy (2002), Boston Public (2003), Medium (2005), My Name Is Earl (2006), Campus Ladies (2006), Help Me Help You (2006), Ned's Declassified School Survival Guide (2007), Easy Abby  (2013–2015), Chicago Fire (2014), and Chicago Med (2020)

Dawn's film work includes Beneath Loch Ness (2001), the all improvisational movie Man of the Year (2002), the late Stephen J. Cannell's Dead Above Ground (2002), Dimples (2008), Teenage Ghost Punk (2014), The Drunk (2014), Uncle John  (2015), Hunter (2019) and An Ideal Candidate (2020). Her notable short film performances include Golden Showers (2004), Lucy (2013), In The Paint (2014), #nofilter (2016), Bozonova (2017), Breathing Above the Tree Line (2018), Vince: The Punctual Vagrant (2020), Town Hall (2019) and Starfield Tectonics (2019)

As a writer, director, and producer, Dawn has made several films for social change with Revealing Media Group including Bystander (2014), Excluded (2015), Viral (2016), Pressure (2016), Help (2017), Blackout (2018) and Unsafe (2019).

As executive producer and star, Dawn has also created  Dorkumentary. This award-winning, improv-based comedy series was made through Tarleton/Dawn Productions. There are a total of seven episodes released from 2008–2018. In November 2017, Adria Dawn and David Tarleton presented DorkumentaryLIVE! at Stage 773 in Chicago, IL turning this web series into a live variety format.

Dawn also works as an on-camera acting teacher, having taught at Acting Studio Chicago, The Performers School, Tarleton/Dawn Productions, The Actors Centre in London and Columbia College Chicago.

Filmography

Acting
Alexis Ronan (TV Movie) 2020
An Ideal Candidate  2020 
Town Hall (Short) 2019
No Better Lot 2020 
Chicago Med (TV Series) 2020 
Vince: The Punctual Vagrant (Short) 2020
Breathing above the Treeline (Short) 2019 
Starfield Tectonics (Short) 2019 
Dorkumentary (TV Series) 2008–2018 
Hunter 2018/I
Bozonova (Short) 2018 
Easy Abby (TV Series) 2013–2018  
Dark Tales  2017
nofilter (Short) 2016
In the Paint (Short)  2015
Uncle John 2015  
Sin Verite 2014 
Teenage Ghost Punk 2014
The Drunk 2014
Chicago Fire (TV Series) 2014
Lucy (Short)  2013/II
Dimples 2008
NCIS (TV Series) 2006–2008 
Ned's Declassified School Survival Guide (TV Series) 2007 
Help Me Help You (TV Series) 2006 
Nip/Tuck (TV Series) 2006  
Campus Ladies (TV Series) 2006
Monday  2006/I
My Name Is Earl (TV Series) 2006
Medium (TV Series)  2005
Golden Showers (Short)  2004
Boston Public (TV Series)  2003 
Dead Above Ground  2002
Judging Amy (TV Series) 2002
Felicity (TV Series) 2002 
Man of the Year 2002 
Beneath Loch Ness 2001 
Popular (TV Series) 1999–2001 
Running Mates (TV Movie) 2000
Blessings from the Food Court 1999
7th Heaven (TV Series) 1999

Director
Unsafe 2019
Architecture (Short) 2020
Ozark Mountain Christmas (Short)  2020
Hustle (Short) 2019/IIThe
Academia (Short) 2019
The Fulbright (Short) 2019
Blackout (Short) 2019
Help (Short) 2018
Pressure (Short) 2016
Viral (Short)  2016
Excluded (Short) 2015
Bystander (Short) 2014

References

External links 
 

Living people
American film actresses
American television actresses
Columbia College Chicago faculty
1974 births
American women academics
21st-century American women